Ascari Cars Ltd. was a British automobile manufacturer based in Banbury, England, and founded by Klaas Zwart. Zwart was the former chairman and majority owner of oil and gas company Petroline, which designed and manufactured its own downhole technology. Petroline was purchased by Weatherford in 1999.

The company was named after Alberto Ascari (1918–1955), the first double winner of the World Championship of Drivers.

The company filed for bankruptcy in 2010. Ascari's official site was also shut down, and has not been updated since 2009.

History 
Ascari Cars was established in Dorset in 1994. Its first limited-edition car, the Ascari Ecosse, was launched in 1998.

In 2000 Ascari Cars built a new facility in Banbury in northern Oxfordshire. Ascari Car's second car, the Ascari KZ1, was developed at Banbury, which also housed Team Ascari's racing assets. The premises are now occupied by Haas F1 Team.

Due to declining sales of the Ascari KZ1 and a large amount of money to produce cars, Ascari suffered heavy financial losses before making the difficult decision to file for bankruptcy in 2010.

Road cars

Race cars

See also
 List of car manufacturers of the United Kingdom

References

 
Defunct motor vehicle manufacturers of the United Kingdom
Sports car manufacturers
Companies based in Banbury
Vehicle manufacturing companies established in 1994
Vehicle manufacturing companies disestablished in 2010
Car brands
2010 disestablishments in England
1994 establishments in England
British companies established in 1994
British racecar constructors